Puente de Rey is a locality located in the municipality of Villafranca del Bierzo, in León province, Castile and León, Spain. As of 2020, it has a population of 23.

Geography 
Puente de Rey is located 136km west of León, Spain.

References

Populated places in the Province of León